Hélène Desportes (1620 – June 24, 1675) is often cited as the first white child born in Canada (New France).  There is considerable disagreement about when she was born and, in particular, if she was born in Quebec or just before she arrived on the continent.

Early life
Her parents were French habitants Pierre Desportes (1580 – after 1629), who was in charge of the warehouse in Quebec as well as the village baker, and his wife Françoise Langlois (c1595 – after 1629), who settled in Quebec.  Her father was a lawyer in the Parlement de Paris and an investor in the Company of 100 Associates which funded Champlain's colony. Her godmother was Madame Hélène Boullé, the wife of Samuel de Champlain.  In his will, Champlain left her 300 livres (about $15,000 in 1997).

After the fall of Québec City in 1629, Hélène and her parents, along with Champlain were transported to London, and then back to France.  Shortly after peace was restored in 1632, Hélène returned to Québec, on May 16, 1633.

Personal life
On the first of October 1634, Hélène married Joseph Guillaume Hébert, son of Louis Hébert and Marie Rollet. Joseph's family had remained in Québec during the occupation and had the first settler's farm there. His father Louis Hébert had been involved in early expeditions to Port Royal with Champlain and others. After Joseph Hebert died in 1639, Hélène at age nineteen, was left with three living children, Joseph (1636–1662), Françoise (1638–1716), and Angélique (born 1639).

She then married Noël Morin, a native of the parish of St-Étienne in Brie-Comte-Robert, a village near Paris, on January 9, 1640, in Quebec City. They had 12 children. Agnes Morin (1641–1687), Germain Morin (1642–1702), Louise Morin (1643–1713), Nicolas Morin (1644–), Jean-Baptiste Morin Belleroche (1645–1694), Marguerite Morin (1646–1646), Hélène Morin (1647–1661), Marie Morin (1649–1730), Alphonse Morin (1650–1711), Noël Morin (1652–1666), Charles Morin (1654–1671), and Marie-Madeleine Morin (1656–1720).

Aided by her aunt Marguerite Langlois, who was the first midwife cited in Church records in Quebec, and having personally brought so many of her own children into the world, Hélène earned the profession of midwife. The earliest known baptismal record with Hélène listed as midwife dates from 1659.

In time, two of Hélène's daughters, a daughter-in-law, and three granddaughters also became midwives, being cited in Church records as "sage-femmes" in the communities of Château-Richer, Cap-St-Ignace, and Montmagny.

See also
Martín de Argüelles, often cited as the first white child born in what is now the United States.

References

PRDH, Certificat de mariage No. 66320.
Ibid., Certificat de mariage No. 66340.
Ibid., Certificat d'union No. 78.
Ibid., Certificat de famille No. 78.
Email Quebec-Research-Digest, Suzanne Boivin Sommerville, 3 April 2002:    "In his entry for Pierre Desportes, Langlois says he was one of the first habitants of the country (1619), that his origins are unknown, that he married in France Françoise Langlois, and that Hélène is the first child of French parents born in the country (I would add documented in some way as born who survived), and he cites _only_ an article by Roy Léon in MSGCF, vol. 2, (1945?) that apparently says a request to the king carries his signature in 1621. He returned to France with his wife in 1629 and did not return. Langlois also says it is important to distinguish him from another Pierre de LA PORTE who drowned 28 April 1639 in the Saint-Charles River."   Langlois, Michel. Dictionnaire Biographique des Ancêtres Québécois (1608–1700). Sillery: La Maison des Ancêtres Québécois. Tome 1 (Lettres A à C), 1998; Tome 2 (Lettres D à I), 1999;Tome 3 (Lettres J à M), 2000; Tome 4, Lettres N à Z. Sillery: Les Éditions du Mitan, 2001.
Biographical Dictionary for The Jesuit Missions in Acadia and New France: 1602-1654, Lucien Campeau, S.J., translated by William Lonc, S.J. & George Topp, S.J., summer 2001, p. 147.
Hélène's World: Hélène Desportes of Seventeenth-Century Quebec; author: Susan McNelley; published by Etta Heritage Press, 2013; pp. 350;

External links 
 Ancestry.com
 Archive.org
 Leveillee.net
 Many-roads.com
 Leveillee.net
 Lactualite.com

People of New France
17th-century births
1620 births
1675 deaths